Anis Khemaissia (born January 27, 1999) is an Algerian footballer who plays for HB Chelghoum Laïd.

Career 
In 2019, he signed a contract with USM Alger.

References

External links
 

Algerian footballers
USM Annaba players
USM Alger players
1999 births
Living people
Association football fullbacks
21st-century Algerian people